Bussert is a German language surname. It stems from the male given name Burchard – and may refer to:
Karl-Heinz Bußert (1955), German rower
Martin Bussert (dead after 1552), Danish architect
Meg Bussert (1949), American actress

References

German-language surnames
Surnames from given names